Pasni may refer to:

 Pasni (celebration) - a Nepalese festival in which a child first consumes rice
 Pasni City - a city of Gwadar District, Balochistan, Pakistan
 Pasni Tehsil - an administrative subdivision of Gwadar District, Balochistan, Pakistan
 Pasni Fish Harbour, Pasni City
 Port of Pasni - port in Pasni City, Balochistan, Pakistan